Sporting CP has a professional table tennis team based in Lisbon, Portugal, since 1921, and plays in Portuguese Men's Table Tennis League and Portuguese Women's Table Tennis League.

Honours (Men's)
Last update: 14 March 2020

Domestic competitions

Portuguese Men's Table Tennis League (39)
 1946, 1947, 1952, 1955, 1956, 1957, 1961, 1966, 1967, 1970, 1980, 1981, 1985, 1986, 1987, 1988, 1989, 1990, 1991, 1992, 1993, 1994, 1995, 1998, 1999, 2000, 2001, 2003, 2007, 2008, 2009, 2012, 2016, 2017, 2018, 2019, 2020, 2021, 2022

Portuguese Men's Table Tennis Cup (33)
 1956, 1957, 1958, 1960, 1966, 1967, 1968, 1969, 1978, 1979, 1980, 1981, 1985, 1986, 1987, 1988, 1989, 1990, 1991, 1992, 1993, 1994, 1999, 2003, 2006, 2008, 2011, 2012, 2016, 2017, 2018, 2019, 2020, 2022

Portuguese Men's Table Tennis Super Cup (16)
 1999, 2000, 2001, 2002, 2003, 2007, 2008, 2011, 2012, 2015, 2016, 2017, 2018, 2019, 2020, 2021

Major competitions
 Winners of Olympic Gold Ibero-American Teams, Pairs and Individual: 2001
 Winners of Olympic Bronze Ibero-American Mixed doubles: 2001

Honours (Women's)
Last update: 14 March 2020

Domestic competitions

Portuguese Women's Table Tennis League (14)
 1957, 1958, 1959, 1960, 1963, 1968, 1972, 1973, 1975, 1976, 1977, 1991, 1992, 2019

Portuguese Women's Table Tennis Cup (16)
 1959, 1960, 1962, 1972, 1974, 1976, 1977, 1978, 1981, 1982, 1988, 1989, 1990, 1991, 1992, 2019

Portuguese Women's Table Tennis Super Cup (1)
 2019

Technical and managerial staff

Current squad

References

Table tennis clubs
Sporting CP sports
Sport in Lisbon
Table tennis in Portugal
1920 establishments in Portugal